The Four-man competition at the 2017 World Championships was held on 25 and 26 February 2017.

Results
The first two runs were held on 25 February 2017 and the last two runs on 26 February 2017.

References

Four-man